"Nothing Sure Looked Good on You" is a song written by Jim Rushing, and recorded by American country music artist Gene Watson.  It was released in December 1979 as the second single from the album Should I Come Home.  The song reached #4 on the Billboard  Hot Country Singles & Tracks chart.

Cover versions
"Nothing Sure Looked Good on You" has also been recorded by American country music singer Alan Jackson. Jackson originally recorded the song for his 1999 album Under the Influence, but ended up not making the album. His version remained unreleased until appearing on his 2009 compilation album Songs of Love and Heartache.

Charts

Weekly charts

Year-end charts

References

1979 songs
1979 singles
Gene Watson songs
Alan Jackson songs
Capitol Records singles
Songs written by Jim Rushing